Daśabhūmikā (Sanskrit. Chinese : 地論宗; pinyin di lun zong) was a Buddhist sect in China, based around Vasubandhu's Sanskrit sutra of the same name (Chinese 十地經; pinyin shi di jing; ten stages sutra).  It was later absorbed into the Huayan school, which adopted this sutra as part of its own central text.

Along with the Gandavyuha Sutra, the Daśabhūmikā shastra is one of the most important chapters of the compounded Avatamsaka Sutra. It describes the Bodhisattvayana, that is the ten stages to Buddhahood, or rather the ten grounds on which a Bodhisattva marches on its path towards complete Enlightenment, or Bodhi. 

Schools of Buddhism founded in China
Buddhism in China